Jennifer Lynn Farrell held the title of Miss New Jersey 2003 and placed in the top 15 at the Miss America 2004 pageant held in Atlantic City, New Jersey. She competed at Miss New Jersey as Miss Atlantic County and won the pageant on her first try. At the time of the Miss America pageant, she was a 19-year-old Spanish and Education major at Rutgers University. Her platform was adoption as an option, which she chose because she was adopted. Her talent was ballet en pointe. She was the youngest adoption specialist in the United States, an honor given to her by the National Adoption Council. She has interned for the Family Law Department of the Superior Court of New Jersey and was the spokesperson for safe haven laws. She was also named one of the 2005 "Top 40 Under 40" by Atlantic City Weekly.

References

Miss America 2004 delegates
Living people
Rutgers University alumni
People from Margate City, New Jersey
American adoptees
1984 births